Tekhsem (also Romanized as Takhsam; also known as Teksam) is a village in Lakan Rural District, in the Central District of Rasht County, Gilan Province, Iran. At the 2006 census, its population was 350, in 95 families.

References 

Populated places in Rasht County